Super Roots is the first installment of the Super Roots EP series by Japanese experimental band Boredoms, released in 1993 by WEA Japan, in 1994 by Reprise/Warner Bros. Records in the United States, and rereleased in 2007 by Very Friendly Records in the United Kingdom and Vice/Atlantic Records in the United States.

Track listing

original WEA Japan CD release (1993)
"Pop Kiss" – 0:54
"Budôkan Tape Try (500 Tapes High)" – 1:41
"Finger Action No. 5" – 0:42
"Chocolate Out" – 2:09
"Pitch at Bunch on Itch" – 0:44
"Machine 3" – 1:04
"Monster Rex & Sound'a'Roundus" – 2:50
"Nuts Room" – 1:28
"Ear? Wig? Web?" – 1:51
"96 Teenage Bondage" – 2:31
"Super Frake 009" – 2:32
"Used CD" – 0:53

Reprise/Warner Bros. Records CD rerelease (1994)
"Pop Kiss" – 0:54
"Budôkan Tape Try (500 Tapes High)" – 1:41
"Finger Action No. 5" – 0:42
"Chocolate Out" – 2:09

Very Friendly and Vice/Atlantic Records CD rereleases (2007) 
"Pop Kiss" – 0:54
"Budôkan Tape Try (500 Tapes High)" – 1:41
"Finger Action No. 5" – 0:42
"Chocolate Out" – 2:09
"Pitch at Bunch on Itch" – 0:44
"Machine 3" – 1:04
"Monster Rex & Sound'a'Roundus" – 2:50
"Nuts Room" – 1:28
"Ear? Wig? Web?" – 1:51
"96 Teenage Bondage" – 2:05
"Kou" – 0:26
"Super Frake 009" – 0:59
"Otsu" – 1:32
"Used CD" – 0:53

References

Boredoms EPs
1993 EPs
Reprise Records EPs